Justus van Maurik (16 August 1846, in Amsterdam – 18 November 1904), was a Dutch author and cigar maker. He was the grandson of Justus van Maurik Sr.

Justus was  known as a writer of farces and humorous plays. In 1878, he published his first novel, . He subsequently wrote hundreds of books. Many of his books were illustrated by the graphic artist Johan Braakensiek.

In 1877, Maurik co-created De Amsterdammer, a newspaper targeted toward audiences in trade, industry and art. The newspaper has now changed its name to the weekly De Groene Amsterdammer.

Works 
 Een bittere pil (1873)
 Mie de porster (1878)
 Janus Tulp (1879, play)
 Uit het volk (1879)
 Van allerlei slag (1881)
 Fijne Beschuiten (1883, play)
 Met z'n achten (1883)
 Burgerluidjes (1884)
 Uit één pen (1886)
 Krates (1887?)
 Papieren kinderen (1888)
 Amsterdam bij dag en nacht (1889)
 Indrukken van een Tòtòk' (1897)
 Novellen en schetsen (1900)
 Toen ik nog jong was (1901) about Jacob Frederik Muller and the Amsterdam neighborhood Fort van Sjako.
 Joris Komijn op de Tentoonstelling Op reis en thuis Stille menschen Verspreide Novellen Amsterdam bij dag en nacht Het Amsterdam van Justus van Maurik Novellen losse reisschetsen Novellen Toon Toos en de Opera Novellen De Laatste der Oempah's Novellen Het genootschap Leuterburg Novellen Een vergeten schuld De Buren 1875 toneelstuk
 Janus Tulp 1879 toneelstuk
 Pakketten voor Dames 1880 play
 Gewichtige dagen 1830-1831 play
 Françoises opstel 1887 play
 Anarchisten tonelstuk Plicht toneelstuk De Planetenjuffrouw 1902 play
 Men Zegt.....  1885   play
 Tijdschift "Ons Amsterdam"1994 no 6 (Het Amsterdam van J v M.)
 Uit het leven van Justus van Maurik 1846 - 1904 (J.H. Rössing)''

External links 
 
 
 

1846 births
1904 deaths
Cigar makers
Dutch male writers
Writers from Amsterdam